Ophir Beach is an undeveloped sandy beach on the Oregon Coast seven miles north of Gold Beach in Curry County, United States. The beach is bounded by U.S. Route 101 on the east. Euchre Creek flows westward to the ocean cutting through the northern third of the beach.

There is a state maintained safety rest area at Ophir Beach with picnic tables and restrooms. 
 
This beach is sometimes referred to as Nesika Beach.

References

Beaches of Oregon
Landforms of Curry County, Oregon